Mustafa Jamal is a politician and the former Member of Parliament of Narsingdi-1.

Career
Jamal was elected to parliament from Narsingdi-1 as a Combined opposition candidate in 1988. He contested the 5th parliamentary election as a candidate of Jatiya Party and lost to Shamsuddin Ahmed Ishaq of the Bangladesh Nationalist Party.

References

Jatiya Party politicians
Living people
4th Jatiya Sangsad members
Year of birth missing (living people)